Description of the Western Isles of Scotland is the oldest known account of the Hebrides and the Islands of the Clyde, two chains of islands off the west coast of Scotland. The author was Donald Monro, a clergyman who used the title of "Dean of the Isles" and who lived through the Scottish Reformation. Monro wrote the original manuscript in 1549, although it was not published in any form until 1582 and was not widely available to the public in its original form until 1774. A more complete version, based on a late 17th-century manuscript written by Sir Robert Sibbald, was first published as late as 1961. Monro wrote in Scots and some of the descriptions are difficult for modern readers to render into English. Although Monro was criticised for publishing folklore and for omitting detail about the affairs of the churches in his diocese, Monro's Description is a valuable historical account and has reappeared in part or in whole in numerous publications, remaining one of the most widely quoted publications about the western islands of Scotland.

Monro also wrote a brief description of the five main branches of Clan Donald that existed in his day under the title "The Genealogies Of The Chief Clans Of The Iles", and this work was included when Description was first published as a stand-alone volume in 1805. The Sibbald manuscript also contains details about the "Council of the Isles" that operated from Eilean na Comhairle in Loch Finlaggan on the island of Islay. This is the most detailed extant account of the supreme judiciary body that had existed under the Lordship of the Isles until its demise in the late fifteenth century.

Author

Donald Monro was born early in the 16th century, the eldest of the six sons of Alexander Monro of Kiltearn and Janet, daughter of Farquhar Maclean of Dochgarroch. His father was a grandson of George Munro, 10th Baron of Foulis. Donald became the vicar of Snizort and Raasay in 1526, and was nominated to the Archdeaconry of the Isles probably in or shortly after 1549. These were troubled times in the Highlands and Islands, with Domhnall Dubh's attempts to resurrect the Lordship of the Isles only failing on his death in 1545. Partly as a result, the See of the Isles was one of the poorest in Scotland and although Monro lists fourteen islands as belonging to its Bishop, in practice rents were hard to collect. In that year, he visited most of the islands on the west coast of Scotland and wrote his manuscript account of them, together with a brief genealogical account of various branches of Clan Donald. He referred to himself as "High Dean of the Isles" and his position was one of considerable influence although the advancing Reformation added further complication to the political landscape in which he was operating.

In 1560 the new Confession of Faith was adopted and ten dioceses were created anew, with the Isles shared between Ross and Argyll. Monro converted to Protestantism and was admitted to the new ministry for the parish of Kiltearn, to which he later added the adjacent Lemlair and Alness. He is said to have lived at Castle Craig, commuting across the Cromarty Firth to preach on Sundays. At Lammas 1563 he became one of three special Commissioners under the Bishop of Caithness responsible for creating new kirks. The duties were arduous but he retained his position for 12 years, despite occasional criticism by the General Assembly. The last record of him is dated 1574 and it is assumed he had died by 1576 when new ministers were appointed for Kiltearn, Lemlair and Alness. He never married and no extant stone marks his burial at Kiltearn, his written work being his sole monument.

Previous descriptions

In or shortly before 83 AD, a traveller called Demetrius of Tarsus related to Plutarch the tale of an expedition to the west coast of Scotland. He stated that it was a gloomy journey amongst uninhabited islands and that he had visited one which was the retreat of holy men. He mentioned neither the druids nor the name of the island. In his Natural History Pliny the Elder states that there are 30 "Hebudes", and makes a separate reference to "Dumna", which Watson (1926) concludes is unequivocally the Outer Hebrides. Writing about 80 years later, in 140–150 AD, Ptolemy, drawing on the earlier naval expeditions of Agricola, also distinguished between the Ebudes, of which he writes there were only five (and thus possibly meaning the Inner Hebrides) and Dumna.

The first written records of native life in the Hebrides begin in the 6th century AD with the founding of the kingdom of Dál Riata. Much of what is known of these times is the product of the monastic sites such as Iona, Lismore, Eigg and Tiree but north of Dál Riata, where the Inner and Outer Hebrides were nominally under Pictish control, the historical record is sparse.

The names of the individual islands reflect a complex linguistic history. The majority are Norse or Gaelic but the roots of some may have a pre-Celtic origin The earliest comprehensive written list of Hebridean island names was undertaken in the 16th century by Monro himself, which in some cases also provides the earliest written form of the island name.

Publications
Monro's work was first published in Latin in 1582. It forms eleven short chapters of George Buchanan's Rerum Scoticarum Historia ("History of Scotland") with all of the islands listed, although with much omission of the detailed island descriptions. The genealogy section was included. In 1603 the portion in Scots relating to the islands was published in Certayne Matters concerning the Realme of Scotland edited by John Monipennie of Pitmilly in the parish of Kingsbarns, Fife. Following Buchanan, this version gives many of the island names in Latin. Thus Monro's "Heddir Iyle" (Heather Isle) is Monipennie's "Ericca". The section was republished in the 1612 Scots Chronicles, in which the acknowledgement of Monro's authorship was omitted.

The original version of Monro's text has been lost, but a copy made in 1642 by Sir James Balfour of Denmilne and Kinnaird, is still extant. Three sections relating to Islay and Lismore, Tiree and Coll, and Harris were omitted, possibly by careless copying. Some 40 years later Sir Robert Sibbald copied out a complete transcript that included sections missing in Balfour. Entitled Description of the Occidental i.e. Western Isles of Scotland by Mr Donald Monro who travelled through the most of them in Anno 1549 it was acquired by the Advocates Library in Edinburgh in 1733. Walter MacFarlane created a third manuscript in 1749, either from a debased original or directly from Balfour as it has the same defects.

Monro's work first came to a wider public when the incomplete version of Description was published in 1774 by William Auld of Edinburgh, along with some supplementary writing about the Hebrides. The full title was Description of the Western Isles of Scotland, called Hybrides; by Mr Donald Monro High Dean of the Isles who travelled through the most of them in the year 1549. With his Genealogies of the Chief Clans of the Isles. Description and Genealogies were published together by Archibald Constable of Edinburgh in 1805, which was the first time Monro's work had been published as a stand-alone volume. Miscellanea Scotica, published in Glasgow in 1818 included Description in volume 2 and the Genealogies in volume 4. In this version Description is given the date of 1594 in error. An edition of the 1818 text limited to 250 copies was published by Thomas D. Morison of Glasgow in 1884.

The shorter list was re-published (without the Genealogies) by Peter Hume Brown in his Scotland before 1700, from Contemporary Documents in 1893 and for the first time the text was subject to scrutiny by a professional historian. Walter MacFarlane's text was published by the Scottish History Society in 1908 as part of his Geographical Collections. Eneas Mackay of Stirling included Description and Genealogies in tandem with Martin Martin's 1703 Description of the Western Islands of Scotland in a 1934 publication. R. W. Munro's 1961 re-publication includes the full text of the Sibbald manuscript (MS), a comparison with the shorter Balfour/Auld versions, the recovered text of Monro's description of the Council of the Isles at Finlaggan, George Buchanan's preface to Description in Rerum Scoticarum Historia and scholarly accompanying material.

Some of the discrepancies between the additions are discussed by R. W. Munro. The 1612 version by Monipennie certainly loses both accuracy and detail.

Critiques
Buchanan was unstinting in his praise for Monro, describing him as "a pious and diligent man". The latter's reputation was secure until 1824 when the geologist John MacCulloch published a lengthy criticism after visiting the islands several times between 1811 and 1821. MacCulloch decried the lack of detail Monro offered on churches and church buildings, going so far as to suggest that he was ignorant of his own diocese, and accusing him of credulity when it came to the recording of folk customs and beliefs. In 1840 the Rev. Alexander Nicolson wrote in the New Statistical Account that "Nothing can show the credulity of the Dean more than his account of the cockles being formed in an embryo on the top of a hill, in a fresh water spring" on Barra. 120 years later R. W. Munro was more generous, noting that the Dean was generally careful to distinguish between the reporting of folk tales and claims as to their veracity and pointing out that MacCulloch's statement that "it is scarcely possible to recognise one in ten" of Munro's island names was unjustified. In 1893 Hume Brown made the first of several modern attempts to identify them and listed 121 out of the 209 on the Monro list he had access to. Description remains one of the most widely quoted publications about the western islands of Scotland.

Identity of the islands

Monro originally wrote in Scots, and some of the descriptions are difficult to render into modern English without a working knowledge of this archaic style.
Some islands have genuine descriptions, but from time to time there are lists such as:
 Vicreran: Narrest to the iyle of Belnachna layes the small iyle of Vickeran.
 Nagawna: Hard on the iyle Vyckeran layes ther a small iyland, namit in Erische Ellan Nagaruwa.
Unless the modern name is clear from Monro's spelling this can lead to difficulties with identification. The Dean's command of Gaelic was weak and he habitually provides island names phonetically in English rather than using Gaelic spellings. R. W. Munro states that "of the 251 islands listed by Monro, I have been unable to identify 27, and a further 23 cannot be regarded as certain". Munro's belief was that Donald Monro knew the Outer Hebrides and Iona well, but that he may have written about the islands of the Argyll coast from secondhand knowledge as they were in the Diocese of Argyll and not his own Diocese of the Isles. Later authors have made additional identifications, although some quite substantial islands do not appear to be in the lists. (They may of course appear under a different name, the connection to which remains to be established.)

The main numbering system is that of R. W. Munro based on the Sibbald MS. The names and numbers used by the 1774 Auld version are also provided. (Monro himself did not appear to use a numbering system.) The list is presented in geographical sections for ease of use after Haswell-Smith. The Latinised names used by Monniepennie (1612) are also listed along with the modern name, where known, along with various notes where the island's identity is in doubt.

Firth of Clyde, Kintyre and the Slate Islands

Vickeran and Nagvisog are the only two outright unknowns in this section, although there are difficulties with 22–24. If R. W. Munro's identifications are correct Donald Munro excluded the sizeable island of Garbh Eilach, after which the Garvellachs group is named. Insh in the Slate Islands is missing, but the modern name, which means simply "island" is clearly incomplete. Its older names include Eilean nan Caorach and Inis-Capul.

Craignish, Taynish, Jura and the Firth of Lorn
R. W. Munro was unable to identify several islands in this group, but Youngson (2001) used his local knowledge and research undertaken by Malcolm MacArthur to suggest various small islands offshore from Jura. In a few instances other nearby candidates exist.

With the exception of Lismore, Monro's "descriptions" in this section are little more than a name recorded in English and "Erische" (i.e. Gaelic), which makes definitive identifications hard to achieve. Youngson writes that his names "defeat all attempts to identify with Lorn, and turn out to be near Jura" and that "the islands of the Small Isles Bay and to the south of Jura are all easily identified" (although he does not make the connections explicit) and turns his attention to numbers 39–44 for a detailed analysis. The strength of Youngson's analysis is that whereas most of these names evaded identification by R. W. Munro, he is able to offer candidates for almost all of them.  In his interpretation, the islands round Jura are listed anti-clockwise starting at Eilean Mor, compared to Islay whose islands are listed by Monro clockwise (sun gaittis). This would however mean that several large islands are not found anywhere in the Monro list, including Eilean Righ, Island Macaskin and Eilean Mhic Chrion off the Argyll coast. There are also numerous other small islands with these names in this vicinity and it is an odd coincidence that numbers 39–41 all have strong contenders in Loch Craignish, as identified by R. W. Munro.

Youngson does not refer to the section below, which is also missing in its entirety from the Auld and Moniepennie publications.

Islay

Monro states "Her begin to circkell Iyla, sune gaittis aboute with litle iyles." The percentage of islands listed is high and must include several very small islets or skerries. This comprehensive listing contrasts with the omission of various larger islands, including a few that are inhabited, in the Outer Hebrides. There are many correspondences between Timothy Pont's map of Islay published by Johan Blaeu (Atlas of Scotland No. 139) and Buchanan's version of Monro's list. It is possible Pont knew of Monro's work and added a few islets on this basis and the correspondence with modern maps and names is not clear in some instances. Some of the linguistic connections between names are also obscure. For example, the Sibbald MS No. 72 is "Hessil" is also "Ellan Natravie" in the Auld version, which names hints at a pronunciation of the Gaelic for "beach" yet Monipennie has "Colurna" and R. W. Munro identifies the island as possibly being Eilean Craobhach.

Colonsay and Mull

Here the shorter Auld version has another missing passage. After Frosa (94) Monipennie states that "all their isles are subject to Sanct Colme's abbey".

Re Staffa above, it is a small island and in Monro's day it had not achieved its later fame, which did not occur until its late 18th century "discovery". The Auld version joins Sibbald here again and Moniepennie adds Mekle Viridis and Little Viridis to the list.

Small Isles

Skye

No 117 is an additional but unnamed island in Auld. "Four myle of sea fra this ile Tuilin, northwart, lyes an ile callit -----."

Barra and the Uists
John Lorne Campbell (1936) states that Monro "apparently had visited Barra, but it is clear that he writes of the smaller islands from hearsay alone". Nos 156–64 are also known as the Bishop's Isles. Monro does not treat Benbecula, South Uist and North Uist as separate islands. Under Ywst he states: "and in the north syde of this there is ane parochin callit Buchagla, [Benbecula] perteining to the said Clandonald. At the north end thereof the sea cuts the countrey againe, and that cutting of the sea is called Careynesse, and benorth this countrey is called Kenehnache of Ywst, that is in Englishe, the north head of Ywst."

Numerous islands are missing from the lists including Ronay, Stuley, Baleshare, Kirkibost and Calvay.

Lewis and Harris and the north west
Lewis and Harris is the largest of Scotland's islands and the third largest in the British Isles, after Great Britain and Ireland. It incorporates Lewis in the north and Harris in the south, both of which are frequently referred to as individual islands, although they are joined by a land border. The island does not have a common name in either English or Gaelic and is referred to as "Lewis and Harris", "Lewis with Harris", "Harris with Lewis" etc. The first sub-section contains another group not listed by the 1774 Auld version. The ordering of the Sibbald MS is in places slightly different from Moniepennie's and the correspondence is not always obvious. The former's numbers 197 and 201 appear to have been omitted completely in the latter.

Harris

Loch Ròg

Some small outer islands are missing including Bearasaigh and Cealasaigh.

Lewis

Various islands are apparently missing including Seaforth Island, Eilean Mhealasta and Boreray.

North Highland coast

Missing are Isle Ristol, Handa and Oldany Island.

Lewis and Harris

Genealogies
Monro provides a brief description of the five main branches of Clan Donald that existed in his day under the title "Heir Followis The Geneologies Of The Chieff Clans Of The Iles".

 Clan Macdonald of Sleat whose chief in Monro's day was Donald Gormeson, a descendant of Hugh of Sleat.
 Clan Eanmore of Dunnyveg.
 Clan Ragnald led by John Moidartach.
 Clan-Ean of Ardnamorachin
 The House of Alexander Carrath, described by Monro as "the fairest hared man (as they say) of aney that ever was".

Clan Donald are descendants of Somerled and Monro claims that in earlier days the House was known as "Clan Gothofred".
This Somerle wes the sone of Gillebryde M'Gilleadam, name Vic Sella, Vic Mearshaighe, Vic Swyffine, Vic Malgheussa, Vic Eacime, Vic Gothefred, fra quhome they were called at that time Clan Gothofred, that is, Clan Gotheray in Hybers Leid, and they were very grate men in that tymes zeire. (Translation from Scots: This Somerled was the son of Gillebryde M'Gilleadam, son of Sella, son of Mearshaighe, son of Swyffine, son of Malgheussa, son of Eacime, son of Gothefred, from whom they were called at that time Clan Gothofred, that is, Clan Gotheray in the Gaelic language, and they were very great men in those times.)

The name "Gofraid" also appears in numerous other versions of Somerled's ancestry.

Council of the Isles

Finlaggan was the site of the court of the Buachaille nan Eileanan, the chief of Clan Donald. Eilean na Comhairle (council island) was originally a timber framed crannog constructed in the 1st century BC, just offshore from Eilean Mòr (large island), which was known as the Island of St Findlugán during the Medieval period.

The Auld version of Monro's text has under No 55 "Ila" only "Ellan Forlagan, in the middle of Ila, ane faire iyle in fresche water" as the concluding sentence and there is no specific reference to the Council. Monipennie provides a slightly longer text as a translation from Buchanan about the government of the Isles that operated from Eilean na Comhairle at Finlaggan. However the Sibbald MS has a much longer description, the earliest and most detailed of the three main texts that have persisted into the modern era. Monro describes the membership of the Council, comprising "14 of the Iles best Barons" and its role as the supreme court of justice.

After the forfeiture of the Lordship of the Isles by James IV in 1493 Finlaggan's buildings were razed and its coronation stone destroyed to discourage any attempts at restoration of the Lordship. The Council was briefly revived during Domhnall Dubh's 1545 rebellion, just four years before Monro's text was written. The barons listed by Monro are:

 Maclean of Duart
 Maclean of Lochbuie
 MacLeod of Harris
 MacLeod of Lewis
 Mackinnon
 McNaie
 MacNeill of Gigha
 MacNeil of Barra
 MacDonald of Dunnyveg
 MacDonald of Ardnamurchan
 Clanranald
 MacDonald of Lochaber
 Bishop of the Isles
Abbot of Iona

The identity of Clan McNaie is unknown.

See also
 Kingdom of the Isles

Notes

Footnotes

References
 Ballin Smith, B. and Banks, I. (eds) (2002) In the Shadow of the Brochs, the Iron Age in Scotland. Stroud. Tempus. 
 Ballin Smith, Beverley; Taylor, Simon; and Williams, Gareth (2007) West over Sea: Studies in Scandinavian Sea-Borne Expansion and Settlement Before 1300. Leiden. Brill.
 Bray, Elizabeth (1996) The Discovery of the Hebrides: Voyages to the Western Isles 1745–1883. Edinburgh. Birlinn.
 Buchanan, George (1582) Rerum Scoticarum Historia. The Philological Museum. 2009 edition edited by Dana Sutton, with English translation. Retrieved 9 November 2012.
 Caldwell, David H. (2011) Islay, Jura and Colonsay: A Historical Guide. Edinburgh. Birlinn. 
Campbell, John Lorne (ed) (1936) The Book of Barra. Acair – reprinted 2006.
 Heather, William (1804) A new and improved chart of the Hebrides or Lewis Islands and adjacent coast of Scotland. National Library of Scotland. Retrieved 30 July 2014. 
 Patrick Hunter Gillies Netherlorn, Argyllshire, and its neighbourhood.
 
 Laing, David (1874) "An episode in the life of Mrs. Rachel Erskine, Lady Grange, detailed by herself in a letter from St. Kilda, January 20, 1738, and other original papers". Proceedings of the Society of Antiquaries of Scotland. xi Edinburgh. pp. 722–30.
 
 McArthur, Calum (1986) Place Names of Jura: a Guide. Self-published. 
 MacLeod, Norma (2004) Raasay: The Island and Its People. Edinburgh. Birlinn 
 Matheson, Angus (April 1963) "Review of Monro's Western Isles of Scotland and Genealogies of the Clans, 1549 by R. W. Munro". The Scottish Historical Review. 42 No. 133, Part 1 pp. 48–51. Edinburgh. Edinburgh University Press/JSTOR.
 Moffat, Alistair (2005) Before Scotland: The Story of Scotland Before History. London. Thames & Hudson
 Monipennie, John (1818) An Abridgement, or Summarie of the Chronicles of Scotland with a Briefe description of Scotland, to which is added The description of the Western Isles of Scotland &c. Edinburgh. David Webster. Probably first published 1612. (Appended to Memoirs of the Lord Viscount Dundee. (1818) Edinburgh, by Google Books.)
 Monro, Sir Donald (1549) A Description Of The Western Isles of Scotland. Appin Regiment/Appin Historical Society. Retrieved 3 March 2007. First published in by William Auld, Edinburgh 1774.
 Munro, R. W. (1961) Monro's Western Isles of Scotland and Genealogies of the Clans. Edinburgh and London. Oliver and Boyd.
 Nicolson, Adam (2002) Sea Room. London. HarperCollins. 
 Omand, Donald (ed.) (2006) The Argyll Book. Edinburgh. Birlinn. 
 Stevenson A., Stewart, J and T. (1818) Miscellanea Scotica. A collection of tracts relating to the history, antiquities, topography, and literature of Scotland. Volumes 2 & 4. Glasgow. John Wylie and Co. Archive.org. Retrieved 25 November 2012.
 Thompson, Francis (1968) Harris and Lewis, Outer Hebrides. Newton Abbot. David & Charles. 
 Watson, W. J. (1994) The Celtic Place-Names of Scotland. Edinburgh. Birlinn. . First published 1926.
 Woolf, Alex (2005) "The origins and ancestry of Somerled: Gofraid mac Fergusa and The Annals of the Four Masters" (pdf) in Mediaeval Scandinavia 15.
 Youngson, Peter (2001) Jura: Island of Deer. Edinburgh. Birlinn. 

Dictionaries
Am Faclair Beag: An English – Scottish Gaelic dictionary incorporating Dwelly Faclair.com. Retrieved 1 December 2012.
 Latin Dictionary. Perseus Digital Library. Tufts University. Retrieved 1 December 2012.
 The Online Scots Dictionary. Scots-online.org. Retrieved 1 December 2012.

Further reading
 A Description of The Western Isles of Scotland, a 2010 English translation by Austin Mardon

External links
 "A Description of the Western Isles of Scotland Called Hybrides, by Sir Donald Monro" at Undiscovered Scotland.

1549 books
1582 books
16th-century manuscripts
Books about Scotland
Hebrides
Islands of Scotland
Lists of landforms of Scotland